Brachyhypopomus is a genus of fish in the family Hypopomidae (bluntnose knifefish) native primarily to tropical and subtropical South America (south to the Río de la Plata Basin), although a single species, B. occidentalis, also occurs in Panama and Costa Rica. They are found in a wide range of static or slow-flowing freshwater habitats such as edges of rivers, streams, floodplains and swamps, but they are absent from deep river channels (a habitat of many other knifefish). There are both species in well-oxygenated waters and poorly oxygenated waters; those in the latter have adaptions that allow them to survive this like larger gills or the capability of gulping up mouthfuls of air from the water surface. Brachyhypopomus feed during the night on small invertebrates. Shout out to William Clifford for finding the fish B).

Overall the various species are similar in general shape, but they do differ in morphometrics and meristics. They vary in general color and pattern, but are well-camouflaged and typically brownish. During the night they change color and become very pale, even species that are dark-colored during the day. Brachyhypopomus are very similar to Microsternarchus and Procerusternarchus.

Species
There are currently 28 recognized species in this genus:

 Brachyhypopomus alberti Crampton, de Santana, Waddell & Lovejoy, 2016
 Brachyhypopomus arrayae Crampton, de Santana, Waddell & Lovejoy, 2016
 Brachyhypopomus batesi Crampton, de Santana, Waddell & Lovejoy, 2016
 Brachyhypopomus beebei (L. P. Schultz, 1944)
 Brachyhypopomus belindae Crampton, de Santana, Waddell & Lovejoy, 2016
 Brachyhypopomus benjamini Crampton, de Santana, Waddell & Lovejoy, 2016
 Brachyhypopomus bennetti Sullivan, Zuanon & Cox-Fernandes, 2013
 Brachyhypopomus bombilla Loureiro & A. C. Silva, 2006
 Brachyhypopomus brevirostris (Steindachner, 1868)
 Brachyhypopomus bullocki Sullivan & Hopkins, 2009
 Brachyhypopomus cunia Crampton, de Santana, Waddell & Lovejoy, 2016
 Brachyhypopomus diazae (Fernández-Yépez, 1972)
 Brachyhypopomus draco Giora, L. R. Malabarba & Crampton, 2008
 Brachyhypopomus flavipomus Crampton, de Santana, Waddell & Lovejoy, 2016
 Brachyhypopomus gauderio (formerly Brachyhypopomus pinnicaudatus) Giora & L. R. Malabarba, 2009
 Brachyhypopomus hamiltoni Crampton, de Santana, Waddell & Lovejoy, 2016
 Brachyhypopomus hendersoni Crampton, de Santana, Waddell & Lovejoy, 2016
 Brachyhypopomus janeiroensis (W. J. E. M. Costa & Campos-da-Paz, 1992)
 Brachyhypopomus jureiae Triques & Khamis, 2003
 Brachyhypopomus menezesi Crampton, de Santana, Waddell & Lovejoy, 2016
 Brachyhypopomus occidentalis (Regan, 1914)
 Brachyhypopomus palenque Crampton, de Santana, Waddell & Lovejoy, 2016
 Brachyhypopomus provenzanoi Crampton, de Santana, Waddell & Lovejoy, 2016
 Brachyhypopomus regani Crampton, de Santana, Waddell & Lovejoy, 2016
 Brachyhypopomus sullivani Crampton, de Santana, Waddell & Lovejoy, 2016 
 Brachyhypopomus verdii Crampton, de Santana, Waddell & Lovejoy, 2016
 Brachyhypopomus walteri Sullivan, Zuanon & Cox-Fernandes, 2013

References

Hypopomidae
Freshwater fish genera
Taxa named by Francisco Mago Leccia